Arthur Kill Terminal is a proposed purpose-built offshore wind port on the Arthur Kill on the west shore of Staten Island, New York. It is intended to be a wind turbine assembly and staging area for various offshore wind farms in the New York Bight. It is planned to be located on  just south of the Outerbridge Crossing. The site, which would allow for  the docking of heavy-lift ships, is not hindered by air draft restrictions since there is no bridge downstream of the facility.

Funding and development
The Arthur Kill Terminal is being developed by a partnership with Empire State Development Corporation (ESD). In October 2022 the project received a $48 million grant from the United States Maritime Administration (part of the US Department of Transportation) for dredging the kill adjacent to the upland site. At that time, construction was expected to begin in late 2023 and projected to begin operating in late 2025.

See also
Offshore wind power in the United States
List of offshore wind farms in the United States
Wind power in New York
Empire Wind
New Bedford Marine Commerce Terminal
New Jersey Wind Port

References

External links 

Arthur Kill Terminal Overview

Transportation buildings and structures in Staten Island
Ports and harbors of New York (state)
Port of New York and New Jersey